Terry Kleisinger (born October 22, 1960 in Regina, Saskatchewan) is a retired professional ice hockey player who played four games in the National Hockey League (NHL).  He played with the New York Rangers.

External links

1960 births
Living people
Canadian ice hockey goaltenders
Sportspeople from Regina, Saskatchewan
New York Rangers players
Wisconsin Badgers men's ice hockey players
Ice hockey people from Saskatchewan
Undrafted National Hockey League players
NCAA men's ice hockey national champions